Muhammad Ali: The Glory Years is a 2002 biography of Muhammad Ali co-authored by Felix Dennis and Don Atyeo. The book is described as a photo-rich biography focussing on Ali's boxing fights starting from the age of 12 to his retirement. The book is based upon the authors's interviews with Ali, and also interviews with Ali's friends, family, opponents, and trainers. The book's coverage of Ali's boxing matches has been praised while the chapter on Ali's fight with George Foreman has been described as "an absolute classic." According to a review in Mint, the book features "[s]ports writing at its best."

References

Books about Muhammad Ali
Biographies about African-American people
2002 non-fiction books
Collaborative non-fiction books
Ebury Publishing books